St Leonards Warrior Square railway station is on the Hastings line in the south of England and is one of four stations that serve Hastings, East Sussex. It is  down the line from London Charing Cross. The station is operated by Southeastern but is also served by trains operated by Southern.

History 
The station building and house, still in existence today, were constructed in 1851 by the South Eastern Railway (SER). The competing London, Brighton and South Coast Railway (LBSCR) trains were not allowed to stop here until December 1870. The two companies maintained separate booking offices until 1923 when they both became part of the Southern Railway. The station is constructed in a narrow valley with higher ground east and west, so that trains arrive and depart either end of the platform through tunnels. This restricts the number of carriages which have direct access to the platform to 8 cars.

Services 

Services at St Leonards Warrior Square are operated by Southern and Southeastern.

The typical off-peak service in trains per hour is:

Southern 
 1 tph to  via 
 1 tph to 

During the peak hours and on Saturdays, the station is also served by an additional hourly semi-fast service between Brighton and Ore.

Southern services at St Leonards Warrior Square are operated using  EMUs and  DMUs.

Southeastern 
 2 tph to London Charing Cross via  (1 semi-fast, 1 stopping)
 2 tph to 

Southeastern services at St Leonards Warrior Square are operated using  EMUs.

References

External links 

Railway stations in East Sussex
DfT Category D stations 
Former South Eastern Railway (UK) stations
Railway stations in Great Britain opened in 1851
Railway stations in Great Britain closed in 1917
Railway stations in Great Britain opened in 1919
Railway stations served by Govia Thameslink Railway
Railway stations served by Southeastern
Transport in Hastings
1851 establishments in England